59 Serpentis, also known as d Serpentis, is a multiple star in the constellation Serpens. The system shows irregular variations in brightness between magnitudes 5.17 and 5.29.

Components
59 Serpentis appears as a close pair of stars, of 5th magnitude and 7th magnitude respectively, separated by four arc-seconds.  The brighter of the two is itself an even closer binary with the two stars separated by only , and only  when they were first detected.  The stars are designated Aa, Ab, and B.

The primary star, component Aa, is a G0 giant.  Component Ab is spectroscopic binary with a period of 1.85 days; the two stars are very similar A-class main sequence stars.  Component B is an F5V possible astrometric binary, but with little known about the orbit or the possible companion.

References

Serpens (constellation)
Serpentis, d
Serpentis, 59
A-type main-sequence stars
G-type giants
Irregular variables
6918
169985
090441
Durchmusterung objects